Thalheim  may refer to:

Places

Austria
 Thalheim, Lower Austria, cadastral community of Kapelln, Sankt Pölten-Land district, Lower Austria
 Thalheim, Styria, suburb in Pöls municipality, former Judenburg District, Styria
 Thalheim bei Wels, town in Wels-Land district, Upper Austria.

Germany
 Thalheim, Saxony, town in Erzgebirgskreis district, Saxony
 Thalheim, Saxony-Anhalt, former municipality now in Bitterfeld-Wolfen, Anhalt-Bitterfeld district, Saxony-Anhalt
 Thalheim (Hesse), constituent community of Dornburg, Hesse, Limburg-Weilburg district, Hesse
 Thalheim (Oschatz), townland of Oschatz, Nordsachsen district, Saxony
 Thalheim, former name of Fraunberg, Bavaria, Erding district, Bavaria
 Thalheim (Sigmaringen), village in Leibertingen municipality, Sigmaringen district, Baden-Württemberg

Poland
 Thalheim (1938–45) German name for Dziurdziewo, village in Nidzica County, Warmian-Masurian Voivodeship

Romania
 Thalheim, German name for Daia village of Roșia, Sibiu, commune in Sibiu County

Switzerland
 Thalheim, Aargau, municipality in Brugg district, Aargau
 Thalheim an der Thur, municipality in Andelfingen district, Zürich

People
 Barbara Thalheim (born 1947), German singer and songwriter
 Bernhard Thalheim (born 1952), German computer scientist
 Hans-Günther Thalheim (1924–2018), German linguist and writer
 Robert Thalheim (born 1974), German stage and film director and screenwriter

Other
 "Thalheim", song on 1999 album Dead Bees on a Cake by David Sylvian

See also
Talheim (disambiguation)